Tideglusib (NP-12, NP031112) is a potent and irreversible small molecule glycogen synthase kinase 3 (GSK-3) inhibitor.

Other GSK inhibitors 

There are few classes of GSK-inhibitors, including lithium
(Martinez et al., 2011), the small peptide L803mts10, and members
of the thiazolidinedione family, containing inhibitors of GSK-3, such as TDZD-8 (Shapira et al., 2007) or
Tideglusib® (Noscira, Madrid, and Spain), the latter having an
irreversible inhibitory effect on GSK-3 (Dominguez et al., 2012). The
inhibition of the GSK-3 pathways through distinct mechanisms has
been associated with a wide range of adverse reactions, ranging
from mild, such as vertigo—or diarrhea (del Ser et al., 2013)—to
very severe, such as hypoglycemia—or tumorigenesis (Martinez
et al., 2011). The use of Tideglusib specifically was associated with
mild-moderate adverse reactions, which included transient increases
in serum creatine kinase, ALT—or gGT—diarrhea, nausea, cough,
fatigue, and headache (del Ser et al., 2013). In a phase-IIa clinical
trial, the treatment was discontinued in 35% of all the active subjects,
due to such adverse effects (del Ser et al., 2013).

Potential applications 
Tideglusib is under investigation for multiple applications:
 Alzheimer's disease and progressive supranuclear palsy. Both clinical trials were discontinued in 2011 (PSP) and 2012 (Alzheimer's disease) due to lack of efficacy 
 Tooth repair mechanisms that promotes dentine reinforcement of a sponge structure until the sponge biodegrades, leaving a solid dentine structure. In 2016, the results of animal studies were reported in which 0.14 mm holes in mouse teeth were permanently filled.
 Tideglusib is being studied in Phase II clinical trials as a treatment for congenital/juvenile-onset myotonic muscular dystrophy type I.

References 

Alzheimer's disease research
1-Naphthyl compounds
Thiadiazoles